Larisa Mikhaylovna Popova (née Aleksandrova, born 9 April 1957 in Tiraspol, Moldavian SSR) is a Moldovan rower who competed for the Soviet Union in the 1976 Summer Olympics.

In 1976, she was a crew member of the Soviet boat, which won the silver medal in the quadruple sculls event.

Four years later, she and her partner Yelena Khloptseva won the gold medal in the 1980 double sculls competition.

References

External links
 

1957 births
Living people
Moldovan female rowers
Soviet female rowers
Olympic rowers of the Soviet Union
Rowers at the 1976 Summer Olympics
Rowers at the 1980 Summer Olympics
Olympic gold medalists for the Soviet Union
Olympic silver medalists for the Soviet Union
Olympic medalists in rowing
People from Tiraspol
Medalists at the 1980 Summer Olympics
Medalists at the 1976 Summer Olympics
World Rowing Championships medalists for the Soviet Union